Nançay is a commune in the Cher department in central France.

Geography
The village is located south of the Sologne and northeast of Vierzon. The Rère flows southwest through the middle of the commune.

History
Its name comes from Nanciacos and first appeared in 1010 (Acts of the Abbot Engilbert). The territory belonged successively to the County of Sancerre and the area of La Chatre. Joan of Arc stayed there, leaving her name to the spring maiden. Its castle dates from the fifteenth century, and was rebuilt during the Renaissance.

Population

Sights
The site was chosen in 1953 by the École Normale Supérieure because of its size, its relative proximity to Paris and the lack of industrial base that can generate noise. Inaugurated by Charles de Gaulle in 1965. The  by  diameter decametric network (144 branches in 10 000 m²).
The Pôle des Étoiles offers tours of the Radioastronomy facility, planetarium shows and self-guided tours of its astronomy exhibits. It also includes educational facilities.
Private Château built on a foundations of the fifteenth-century castle, rebuilt in the Renaissance and then in 1848.
Église Saint-Laurian, built in 1624, rebuilt in the nineteenth century after it was destroyed by fire.
Capazza Gallery of contemporary art, an historical monument created in 1975 by Gerard and Sophie Capazza.

Gastronomy
A shortbread biscuit was created in 1953, after an error in following a recipe by Jacques and Albert Fleurier.

Personalities 
 The 18th-century French historian and political writer Louis-Gabriel Du Buat-Nançay (1732–1787) died in Nançay
Alain-Fournier lived in and described the village in his novel Le Grand Meaulnes.

See also
Communes of the Cher department

References

Communes of Cher (department)
Berry, France